Cassandre (Cassandra) is an opera by the French composers Toussaint Bertin de la Doué and François Bouvard, first performed at the Académie Royale de Musique (the Paris Opera) on 18 February 1706. It takes the form of a tragédie en musique in a prologue and five acts. The libretto, by François Joseph Lagrange-Chancel, is based on the Oresteia by Aeschylus.

References

Sources
 Libretto at "Livrets baroques"
 Félix Clément and Pierre Larousse Dictionnaire des Opéras, Paris, 1881, page 141.

French-language operas
Tragédies en musique
Operas by Toussaint Bertin de la Doué
Operas by François Bouvard
Operas
1706 operas
Operas by multiple composers
Operas based on Agamemnon (Aeschylus play)